Hillard Doyle (born 15 November 1935) is a Barbadian cricketer. He played in one first-class match for the Barbados cricket team in 1961/62.

See also
 List of Barbadian representative cricketers

References

External links
 

1935 births
Living people
Barbadian cricketers
Barbados cricketers
People from Saint Michael, Barbados